Killurin is a village and townland in County Offaly, Ireland. The population was 142 at the 2016 census. In 2015, local Gaelic games club Killurin GAA merged with neighbouring Killeigh GAA  to form Clodiagh Gaels.

People
 Hugh Mahon (1857–1931), Australian politician, born Killurin.
 William Quarter (1806–1848), first Catholic Bishop of Chicago, born Killurin.

References

Towns and villages in County Offaly
Townlands of County Offaly